On Golden Pond is a 1979 play by Ernest Thompson. The plot focuses on aging couple Ethel and Norman Thayer, who spend each summer at their home on a lake called Golden Pond. During the year the story takes place, they are visited by daughter Chelsea with her fiancé Billy Ray and his son Billy Ray Jr. The play explores the often turbulent relationship the young woman shared with her father growing up, and the difficulties faced by a couple in the twilight years of a long marriage.

Synopsis

Act 1

May
Norman and Ethel arrive at the summer house, finding it in need of repairs. There are hints that Norman is having problems with his memory.

June
To Ethel's chagrin, Norman makes a nominal effort to find a job in the classified ads. The mailman Charlie stops by and reminisces about the Thayers' daughter Chelsea whom he used to date. A letter arrives from Chelsea saying that she is coming from California with her boyfriend Bill to celebrate Norman's 80th birthday. It becomes clearer that Norman is struggling with memory loss as he continues to forget names and places that should be familiar.

July
Chelsea arrives with Bill Ray and his 13-year-old son Billy Ray Jr. Chelsea asks her parents if Billy Jr. can stay with them while she and Bill go to Europe. Norman (a bit reluctantly) and Ethel agree to keep Billy Jr.

Act 2

August
Norman and Billy Jr. have become friends, and spend much of their time fishing. Chelsea returns, and reveals that she and Bill are now married. Ethel shows her impatience with Chelsea's habit of bitterly harping on the past. Chelsea confronts her father about their troubled relationship, and the two have a reconciliation.

September
Norman and Ethel are packing to leave for the winter. Chelsea calls, and they agree to go visit her in California. Norman seems to suffer a heart attack (whilst picking up a box of his mother-in-law's heavy china) but recovers, and the pair leave their home along Golden Pond.

Productions 
After five previews, the first Broadway production, directed by Craig Anderson, set and costume design by Steven Rubin, and lighting design by Craig Miller, opened on February 28, 1979 at the New Apollo Theatre, where it ran for 126 performances. The cast was Tom Aldredge (Norman Thayer Jr.), Frances Sternhagen (Ethel Thayer), Ronn Carroll (Charlie Martin), Barbara Andres (Chelsea Thayer Wayne), Mark Bendo (Billy Ray), and Stan Lachow (Bill Ray). After a summer break, it reopened with the same cast on September 12 at the Century Theatre, a small playhouse in the basement of the Paramount Hotel, where it ran for an additional 256 performances. Ben Slack replaced Ronn Carroll during the course of the run at the Century Theatre.

After 19 previews, a Broadway revival with an African American cast directed by Leonard Foglia and produced by Jeffrey Finn opened on April 7, 2005 at the Cort Theatre, where it ran for 93 performances. James Earl Jones and Leslie Uggams headed the cast. Jones, who often was ill during the run, eventually was diagnosed with pneumonia, forcing the production to a sudden close.

Michael Learned and Tom Bosley starred in a 2006-07 U.S. national tour produced by Finn. Jack Klugman headlined a 2008 tour.

Adaptations 
The play was adapted for the screen written by Thompson in 1981. The film On Golden Pond was released in December 1981, directed by Mark Rydell and produced by Bruce Gilbert with Henry Fonda, Katharine Hepburn and Jane Fonda in the starring cast.

In 2001, CBS aired a live television adaptation of the play that was publicized heavily in the press due to the reunion of former Sound of Music stars Julie Andrews and Christopher Plummer in the lead roles. It also starred Glenne Headly. For Julie Andrews, the broadcast marked her first instance of singing publicly, albeit only a few notes, since throat surgery in 1995 had hampered her singing voice.

Nominations
1979 production
 Tony Award for Best Actress in a Play (Sternhagen)  
 Drama Desk Award for Outstanding New Play 
 Drama Desk Award for Outstanding Actor in a Play (Aldredge) 
 Drama Desk Award for Outstanding Actress in a Play (Sternhagen) 
 Drama Desk Award for Outstanding Costume Design 
 Drama Desk Award for Outstanding Set Design 
 1979 Selection, The Burns Mantle Theater Yearbook, The Best Plays of 1978-1979

2005 production
 Tony Award for Best Revival of a Play 
 Tony Award for Best Actor in a Play (Jones)

References

External links
 

1979 plays
Broadway plays
American plays adapted into films